Lithosarctia is a genus of tiger moths in the family Erebidae. The genus was erected by Franz Daniel in 1954. The moths in the genus are from western China and Himalayas.

Species
Lithosarctia hoenei Daniel, 1954

Subgenus Ocnogynodes Dubatolov, 1987 
Lithosarctia goergneri de Freina & Witt, 1994
Lithosarctia kozlovi Dubatolov, 2002
Lithosarctia thomasi de Freina & Witt, 1994
Lithosarctia y-albulum (Oberthür, 1886)

References

Spilosomina
Moth genera